Dietes robinsoniana, the Lord Howe wedding lily, is found naturally only on Lord Howe Island. It grows on cliff faces, often in exposed situations. Found also on forest margins and the tops of Mount Gower and Mount Lidgbird and behind the beaches on Lord Howe Island.  It is one of the world's most intriguing and remarkable biogeographic disjunctions, with its nearest phylogenetic relatives occurring in Africa.

 
This is the largest plant in the genus Dietes. It does not tolerate cold temperatures. It is an uncommon plant, though it may be locally abundant in certain sites. Flowering occurs from September to December. The flowers are white with yellow, lasting for one day only. 
 Link to a flower photo:

Flat triangular seeds form in a roundish shaped capsule, 3 to 4 cm long. The black seeds are around 10 mm long.

References

Iridaceae
Endemic flora of Lord Howe Island
Plants described in 1871
Garden plants
Taxa named by Ferdinand von Mueller
Taxa named by Charles Moore